The Battle of Sarsa was fought in 21 December 1704 between the Khalsa and the Mughal Empire.

Background and battle 
Guru Gobind Singh's family got separated and Mani Singh, along with other Sikhs, took Mata Sundri and Mata Sahib Kaur to Delhi, whereas Gobind, the Panj Piare, Ajit Singh, Jujhar Singh and a handful of Sikh warriors went to Chamkaur for the last stand.

Even as Mughal General Wazir Khan promised Gobind safe passage after the siege of Anandpur, he still pursued the survivors. At Shahi Tibbi, Jiwan Singh was killed and the Sikhs were destroyed while crossing the Sarsa River, with Gobind's two younger sons being captured and later murdered. Gobind was defeated the next day at Chamkaur.

Notes

References

Sources

Battles involving the Sikhs
Battles involving the Mughal Empire
Conflicts in 1704